Yialousa ( [from , meaning " Sea"]), or Gialousa,is a town under the de facto control of Northern Cyprus, claimed by Cyprus. Yialousa is located on the Karpas Peninsula, and one of the sub-districts of the İskele District. In 2011, Yialousa had a population of 1,774.

In 1960, Yialousa had 2,538 inhabitants, only one of whom was a Turkish Cypriot, the rest being Greek Cypriot. By 1973, the population was 2,460, and composed of only Greek Cypriots. When the Turkish and Turkish Cypriot forces reached the town during the Turkish invasion of Cyprus in August 1974, the Greek inhabitants could not move to the south of the island, which was controlled by the Republic of Cyprus. Residents of the village were forcibly evicted by the Turkish army, whilst some left the village gradually because of restrictions on freedom of movement and education, and to reunite with family members who had been taken as prisoners and had ended up in the southern portion of the island after they were returned. In 1976, displaced Turkish Cypriots from the Kokkina exclave (Turkish Erenköy) were resettled in the village, and it was renamed "Yeni Erenköy" ("New Erenköy").

International relations

Twin towns – sister cities
Yialousa is twinned with:

 Sincan, Ankara, Turkey

References 

Communities in Famagusta District
Populated places in İskele District
Municipalities of Northern Cyprus